Perfume and Piss is the eleventh studio album by British punk rock band GBH and their first record released via Hellcat Records. It was recorded from April to July 2009 and released on April 6, 2010. The album was produced by GBH longtime fan and friend Lars Frederiksen.

Track listing
Tracklist adapted from iTunes

Personnel
Colin Abrahall - vocals
Colin "Jock" Blyth - guitar
Ross Lomas - bass
Scott Preece - drums
Michael Rosen - mastering & mixing
Lars Frederiksen - mixing
Miguel Seco - engineering
Tom D. Kline - artwork & design
Craig Burton - photography
Johnny Fletcher-Fujimoto - photography
Miranda Termaat - photography

References

External links 

2010 albums
Charged GBH albums
Hellcat Records albums